Ambalanjanakomby is a town and commune in Madagascar. It belongs to the district of Maevatanana, which is a part of Betsiboka Region. The population of the commune was estimated to be approximately 10,000 in 2001 commune census.

Only primary schooling is available. The majority 85% of the population of the commune are farmers.  The most important crops are rice and other peas, while other important agricultural products are beans and maize.  Industry provides employment for 10% of the population. Additionally fishing employs 5% of the population.

References and notes 

Populated places in Betsiboka